KEYF-FM (101.1 MHz "Key FM 101.1") is a commercial radio station, licensed to Cheney, Washington, and serving the Spokane metropolitan area. It broadcasts a classic hits radio format, known as "Key 101" and is owned by Stephens Media Group.  KEYF-FM carries the syndicated "John Tesh, Intelligence for Your Life" show, middays Monday through Saturday.  It also airs the classic "American Top 40 with Casey Kasem" on Sunday mornings.  The offices and radio studios are on East 57th Avenue in Spokane.

KEYF-FM has an effective radiated power (ERP) of 100,000 watts, the maximum for most FM stations in the U.S.  The transmitter is off East Jamieson Road in Freeman, Washington, amid the towers for other Spokane-area FM and TV stations.

History
It had a soft AC format before flipping to oldies in 1991 after stunting with different versions of "Louie Louie" as "Louie 101.1". It changed to its current classic hits format on March 31, 2008.

External links
 Station website

References

EYF-FM
Radio stations established in 1986
1986 establishments in Washington (state)